Gaidar is a Russian surname. It was originally a pen name of Russian writer Arkady Gaidar (1904-1941) and was taken as their last name by his descendants. His son, Timur Gaidar, published two versions of the pseudonym's origin:

 Arkady took the name Gaidar from a  Khakas-language word meaning going first, the leader.
 The name represents an abbreviation of French "Golikov Arkadi d 'Arzamas", which means "Golikov, Arkadi from Arzamas".

The surname may also refer to:

Timur Gaidar (1926–1999), Soviet admiral, Arkady's son
Yegor Gaidar (1956–2009), former acting Prime Minister of Russia, Timur's son
Maria Gaidar (born 1982), Russian activist, daughter of Yegor Gaidar

See also
Heydar, an Iranian given name, sometimes  transliterated as Gaidar 
Golikov, Arkady Gaidar's original surname

References

Russian-language surnames